Sun Is Shining may refer to:

"Sun Is Shining" (Bob Marley and the Wailers song), 1971 song by Bob Marley & the Wailers, later remixed by Funkstar De Luxe in 1999
"Sun Is Shining" (Axwell and Ingrosso song), 2015
"Sun Is Shining" (The Fireman song), 2008
"Sun Is Shining" (Lost Frequencies song), 2019
"The Sun Is Shining", 1957 song by Jimmy Reed

See also
"Sun Is Still Shining", 1969 song by the Moody Blues
Behind the Clouds the Sun Is Shining, in Dutch Achter de wolken schijnt de zon, 1925 Dutch silent documentary film directed by Willy Mullens